Daniel Amos (born 22 December 1999) is a professional footballer who plays as a left-back for  club Grimsby Town. 

Amos has previously represented Northern Ireland at under-19 and under-21 level. He began his career at Doncaster Rovers, turning professional in 2017. He spent time on loan at Buxton and Hartlepool United, before signing a short-term contract with Port Vale in September 2021 after being released by Doncaster. He joined Grimsby Town in January 2022 and helped the club to win promotion out of the National League via the play-offs in 2022.

Club career

Doncaster Rovers
Amos came through the Doncaster Rovers youth team, and made his senior debut on 30 August 2016, coming on as a 71st-minute substitute for Matty Blair in a 2–0 win at Mansfield Town in an EFL Trophy group stage game. He signed his first professional contract in November 2017, keeping him at the club until summer 2019. On 2 February 2018, he joined Northern Premier League Premier Division club Buxton on a one-month loan. Doncaster's under-18 coach Paul Stancliffe said that "getting that experience is what will help him develop". After the loan spell ended, Amos said that "I played every game whilst I was there, and I scored in a derby in my last game which was great".

He made his League One debut on 28 April 2018, playing the full 90 minutes of a 0–0 draw at Oldham Athletic. Manager Darren Ferguson said that "his display was the most pleasing thing to take away from it". He played four matches for "Donny" in the 2017–18 season and was handed the club's Young Player of the Year award. He came on as a second-half substitute on the opening day of the 2018–19 season and said that "I am hoping to get a few starts this season". However he and Branden Horton had to compete with Danny Andrew for the left-back position, who went on to start every league game of the campaign. Nevertheless, Rovers exercised an option to extend Amos's contract until summer 2020.

On 8 January 2019, Amos joined National League club Hartlepool United on loan until the end of the 2018–19 season. Doncaster boss Grant McCann said that "Richard Money is a good, experienced manager and I'm sure he'll get the best out of Danny. It's a win-win for all parties." Money believed that Amos's arrival would allow him to move Mark Kitching up to midfield. Amos made his "Pools" debut four days later, in a 2–1 FA Trophy defeat to AFC Telford United at Victoria Park, after which Money said that "I thought he was our best player". Amos stated that the loan spell, which saw him feature mainly as a left wing-back in eight games, meant that "I had to make my own way up to Hartlepool everyday, it was a big task for me which helped me mature and take on more responsibility". Hartlepool manager Craig Hignett ruled out a move to sign Amos in the summer as he felt Doncaster were keen to keep hold of the young left-back.

Speaking in October 2019, Amos said that new manager Darren Moore "really trusts everyone to do well in the team and I think that's good for players like myself... that's a massive boost". On 9 November, he was voted as man of the match for his performance in a 1–1 draw at AFC Wimbledon in the first round of the FA Cup after he provided an assist for Tom Anderson's goal; he was put in the starting line-up after Reece James was ruled out due to illness. Amos started his first league game of the 2019–20 campaign on 20 February following an injury to James. He signed a new one-year deal in July 2020.

Amos made his first league start of the 2020–21 campaign in a 1–0 win over Lincoln City at the Keepmoat Stadium on 31 October. He played the final ten minutes of the club's victory over Championship side Blackburn Rovers in the second round of the FA Cup, which set up a third round tie at West Ham United. He played the last eleven minutes of what would finish as a 4–0 defeat at the London Stadium. He ended the campaign with 13 appearances to his name. Doncaster published their retained list on 14 May 2021 and it was revealed that Amos would be released upon the expiry of his contract on 30 June.

Port Vale
On 3 September 2021, Amos signed a short-term contract with League Two side Port Vale until January 2022 after impressing manager Darrell Clarke on a two week trial. He featured in three EFL Trophy games but failed to dislodge first-team regulars James Gibbons and Dan Jones down the left side and departed the club following the expiry of his contract on 7 January 2022.

Grimsby Town
On 13 January 2022, Amos signed for National League side Grimsby Town on a deal until the end of the 2021–22 season; manager Paul Hurst said that it was important that the "Mariners" provide competition for Adam Crookes at left-back after Sebastian Revan's loan spell ended. He featured 18 times in the league, helping Grimsby to qualify for the play-offs with a sixth-place finish. Amos played the full 90 minutes of the 2022 National League play-off Final as Grimsby beat Solihull Moors 2–1 at the London Stadium to return to the Football League at the first attempt. He was offered a new contract, signing a one-year deal on 28 June.

International career
Amos was born in Sheffield, England, but became eligible to represent Northern Ireland as his mother came from Belfast. On 29 September 2017, manager Stephen Frail called up Amos to the Northern Ireland under-19 squad for upcoming matches against Poland, Germany and Belarus. He made his debut the opening match against Poland, scoring his side's only goal as they were defeated 2–1 at Stadion Miejski on 4 October. He also played the game against Belarus and Amos said that "we finished third in the table so didn't go through, but scoring in an international and playing in a 55,000 seater stadium was some experience". He was called up to the Northern Ireland under-21 team for the second time in October 2018, having previously been unable to play after picking up an injury following his first call up. He was called up by manager Ian Baraclough for a third time in March 2019 and finally made his under-21 debut in a 1–0 friendly win against Bulgaria in Spain on 22 March. He played five games in the 2021 UEFA European Under-21 Championship qualification campaign.

Style of play
Amos is a left-back who can also play at wing-back. A left-footed player, he has good self-belief and composure.

Career statistics

Honours
Grimsby Town
National League play-offs: 2022

References

1999 births
Living people
Footballers from Sheffield
English footballers
English people of Northern Ireland descent
Northern Ireland youth international footballers
Northern Ireland under-21 international footballers
Association football midfielders
Doncaster Rovers F.C. players
Buxton F.C. players
Hartlepool United F.C. players
Port Vale F.C. players
Grimsby Town F.C. players
Northern Premier League players
English Football League players
National League (English football) players